New York's 16th State Assembly district is one of the 150 districts in the New York State Assembly. It has been represented by Gina L. Sillitti since 2021. She is a Democrat.

Geography
District 16 is located in Nassau County, within the Town of North Hempstead. The district includes the villages of Great Neck, North Hills, East Hills, Flower Hill, Old Westbury, Roslyn Estates, and Lake Success, as well as the hamlets of Roslyn Heights, Port Washington, and Herricks.

Recent election results

2022

2020

2018

2016

2014

2012

2010

References

16
Nassau County, New York